Vadim Nikolayevich Podbelsky (November 1887 – February 25, 1920) was a Russian revolutionary and Bolshevik politician following the Russian Revolution.

Born in Yakutia in 1887 to a family of exiled revolutionaries, Podbelsky joined the Bolshevik faction of the Russian Social Democratic Labour Party in 1905. During the 1905 uprising he was involved in anti-government demonstrations and meetings. Fearing arrest, Podbelsky fled to France in 1906.

After the October Revolution he served as the head of the Moscow City Committee.

Vadim Podbelsky died on February 25, 1920, in Moscow and was buried in Mass Grave No. 4 of the Kremlin Wall Necropolis. Former station Ulitsa Podbelskogo on the Moscow Metro was named in his honour.

References

1887 births
1920 deaths
Old Bolsheviks
Burials at the Kremlin Wall Necropolis
Russian Social Democratic Labour Party members
Russian revolutionaries
People from Tambov
People's commissars and ministers of the Russian Soviet Federative Socialist Republic